Gregg Takayama (born 1952 in Honolulu, Hawaii) is an American politician and a Democratic member of the Hawaii House of Representatives since January 16, 2013, representing District 34.

Education
Takayama earned his BA in journalism from the University of Hawaii at Manoa.

Elections
2012 with Democratic Representative Mark Takai redistricted to District 33, Takayama won the District 34 August 11, 2012, Democratic Primary with 3,359 votes (49.1%), and was unopposed for the November 6, 2012, General election.
2014, Takayama was unopposed in the Democratic Primary. Won the General election with 5,471 votes (60.5%).

References

External links
Official page at the Hawaii State Legislature
Campaign site
 

1952 births
Living people
Democratic Party members of the Hawaii House of Representatives
Politicians from Honolulu
University of Hawaiʻi alumni
21st-century American politicians
Hawaii politicians of Japanese descent